Chuxian Prison is a prison in Chuxian County, Anhui, China.

See also
List of prisons in Anhui

References
Laogai Research Foundation Handbook

Prisons in Anhui
Suzhou, Anhui